Nevelsky Uyezd (Невельский уезд) was one of the eleven subdivisions of the Vitebsk Governorate of the Russian Empire. It was situated in the eastern part of the governorate. Its administrative centre was Nevel.

Demographics
At the time of the Russian Empire Census of 1897, Nevelsky Uyezd had a population of 110,394. Of these, 84.0% spoke Belarusian, 7.4% Yiddish, 7.1% Russian, 0.6% Finnish, 0.3% Polish, 0.2% Estonian, 0.2% Romani, 0.1% German and 0.1% Latvian as their native language.

References

 
Uezds of Vitebsk Governorate